Media Capital SGPS, SA, is a Portuguese media corporation founded in 1988 (originally named SOCI - Sociedade de Comunicação Independente, founded by Luís Nobre Guedes), based in Oeiras, Lisbon. Media Capital is a major media group in Portugal, and is one of the biggest media corporations in Europe. Media Capital distributes 20th Century Fox and Metro-Goldwyn-Mayer home video releases in the Portuguese market under the Castello Lopes label. From 2005 to 2020, PRISA was the principal owner of Media Capital.

Businesses 
Media Capital operates in several areas of media and advertising. Here is a list of the companies owned by Media Capital.

Broadcasting
TVI, a television broadcaster. It was acquired by Media Capital in 1997.
 CNN Portugal (brand under license from Warner Bros. Discovery and CNN Global)
 TVI Ficção
 pt:TVI Reality
 TVI Internacional
 TVI África

Magazines
 Media Capital Edições, a magazine publisher:
 Lux Magazine (women's magazine)
Maxmen (Portuguese version of Maxim men's magazine)
Portugal Diário (news magazine)
Agência Financeira (financial magazine)
MaisFutebol (Association football magazine)

Internet
 IOL (Portugal), a multimedia content provider (also an Internet service provider previously).

Former units

Radio
Media Capital Rádios, a radio broadcaster, which includes several radio stations (sold to Bauer Media Group in February 2022):

Rádio Comercial - national net of broadcasters:
88.1 FM - Fóia (Monchique) → 10 kW
88.7 FM - Lamego (Viseu) → 5 kW
88.9 FM - Minhéu (Vila Real)  → 10 kW
89.0 FM - Leiria - Maunça  → 1 kW
89.3 FM - Esposende (Braga)  → 0,4 kW
90.8 FM - Lousã (Coimbra)  → 44 kW
91.9 FM - Bornes Mountains → 10 kW
92.0 FM - Mendro Mountains (Beja district - also serving Évora's district) → 50 kW
92.2 FM - Oliveirinha (Aveiro) → 0,2 kW
93.9 FM - Samil - Bragança → 10 kW
94.3 FM - Viseu → 0,5 kW

96.1 FM - Faro - São Miguel/Goldra → 10 kW
96.1 FM - Guarda/P. Vento → 10 kW
96.8 FM - Grândola → 10 kW
97.4 FM - Lisboa (Monsanto Forest Park) → 44 kW
97.7 FM - Porto (Monte da Virgem) → 44 kW
98.2 FM - Fundão (Gardunha Mountains) → 10 kW
98.5 FM - Sintra → 0,3 kW
98.9 FM - Portalegre (Marada Alta Mountains) → 10 kW
99.0 FM - Valença do Minho - Monte do Faro → 10 kW
99.2 FM - Braga (Sameiro) → 5 kW
99.8 FM - Montejunto Mountains → 10 kW
103.1 FM - Vouzela (Pena Hill) → 0,2 kW

Cidade FM - ten local radio stations:
91.6 FM -  Lisboa → 5 kW
97.2 FM -  Redondo → 0.5 kW
99.3 FM -  Alcanena → 2 kW
99.7 FM -  Penacova (Coimbra) → 1 kW
99.7 FM -  Loulé (Faro district) → 2 kW

106.2 FM - Montijo → 1 kW
101.0 FM - Vale de Cambra (Aveiro) → 0.5 kW
102.8 FM - Viseu → 2 kW
104.4 FM - Braga (Amares) 104.4 FM → 1 kW
107.2 FM - Vila Nova de Gaia - Porto → 0.5 kW

M80 Radio
90.0 - Matosinhos (Porto)
93.0 - Leiria
95.6 - Penalva do Castelo (Viseu) 
96.4 - Santarém
98.4 - Coimbra
94.4 FM - Aveiro
97.4 FM - Vila Real

104.3 - Lisbon and Setúbal
106.1 - Faro
106.4 - Beja and Évora
106.7 - Portalegre
107.1 - Portimão
107.5 - Grândola / Santiago do Cacém
103.8 - Braga and Fafe

Vodafone FM
107.2 - Lisbon Metro Area
103.0 - Coimbra & Centre region
94.3 - Porto Metro Area

Smooth FM
89.5 - Matosinhos - Porto
92.8 - Figueiró dos Vinhos (Coimbra)
96.6 - Lisbon
97.7 - Santarém
103.0 - Barreiro

Shut down stations

Best Rock FM
89.5 FM - Valongo
101.1 FM - Moita

Star FM
Benavente (Belmonte) 1035 AM
96.6 FM - Lisboa
105.8 FM - Porto
96.8 FM - Sabugal

 
103.0 FM - Coimbra and Cantanhede
97.7 FM - Santarem
104.4 FM - Manteigas

Ownership 
Media Capital is owned by PRISA (95%), and by the Savings Banks of Vigo, Ourense and Pontevedra (5%).

References

External links
Media Capital - official website
MCR

Companies listed on Euronext Lisbon
Mass media companies established in 1988
Mass media companies of Portugal
1988 establishments in Portugal